Big Scary Monsters Recording Company (often known simply as Big Scary Monsters or BSM Records) is an independent record label based in Oxford, England, UK.

Its releases include La Dispute, Beach Slang, Modern Baseball, Minus The Bear, mewithoutYou, Kevin Devine, Caspian, yndi halda, Gnarwolves, The Fall of Troy, Andrew W.K., Tall Ships, Into It. Over It., Toe, Pulled Apart By Horses, Meet Me In St Louis, Cursive, Joyce Manor, Bear vs. Shark, American Football, Axes, Delta Sleep, Tangled Hair and Talons amongst others.

History

Big Scary Monsters was established in 2001 by Kevin Douch whilst still in sixth form.

In Autumn 2006 BSM launched its first sub-label, Alcopop! Records. Alcopop! began working with bands such as Johnny Foreigner, Anamanaguchi, Fight Like Apes and others.

On 7 September 2010, the label celebrated its 100th release. Partied Hard was a DVD/CD compilation featuring over thirty promo, live and bonus videos from the label's history. It was only available between 7 September (the day after BSM099 came out) and 24 October 2010 (the day before BSM101 was due out).

In April 2011 BSM co-founded Pink Mist with fellow indie labels Holy Roar and Blood And Biscuits. A 12" compilation was released on Record Store Day to mark the launch. Pink Mist is an East London-based collective releasing records, promoting regular live shows and blogging about up and coming new bands. In 2012 it was nominated for Best Small Label at the AIM Awards.

Kevin Douch was featured as a speaker at AIM's Indie Con event in 2017.

Big Scary Monsters announced new albums from Lemuria, Yndi Halda, Nervus and Tangled Hair for 2018 as well as a vinyl reissue of Hell Is For Heroes' 'The Neon Handshake'.

From 2007 to 2016 BSM hosted an annual five-a-side football tournament at Wembley Powerleague, with bands, labels, magazines, shops and other music industry teams competing.

Pop-up stores
In December 2016 the label announced that they would be opening up a pop-up Store in Hackney London from January 23 to February 4 in 2017. This two week period was eventually catalogued as BSM200 and was a celebration of the label's 16th birthday. During the pop up there were in-store performances from Modern Baseball, Kevin Devine, Gnarwolves, Delta Sleep, Beach Slang and more. There were also other non-music based events including, a-bring-your-dog day, a screen printing day with Awesome Merchandise, and a cocktail bar run by the band Tiny Moving Parts.

In March 2018, BSM announced that they would be opening their second pop-up store in Cardiff. The in-store featured performances from UK based signings Jamie Lenman, Orchards, Nervus, and US band Slaughter Beach, Dog.

In 2019, BSM continued its run of form and announced their pop-up store would be coming to Glasgow in Scotland. Over their time there the label hosted in store performances from We Were Promised Jetpacks and in store talks from prominent Scottish music figures.

Reissues

Over the last few years BSM have continued to reissue classic yet niche releases from the early 00's.

- The Gloria Record - A Lull In Traffic - 2020
Released to coincide with the 20th anniversary of the EP's original release.

- And So I Watch You From Afar - ASIWYFA - 2019 
A 10th anniversary reissue featuring a remastering of the original record and a live recording of the band performing their debut record all consisting in a 4LP box set.

- Hell Is For Heroes - Neon Handshake - 2018
A celebration of the band's debut album turning 15

- Reuben - In Nothing We Trust - 2017
Less of a reissue and more of a first press. To coincide with the final Reuben album turning 10 BSM pressed In Nothing We Trust on White vinyl.

- Bear vs. Shark - Right Now, You're in the Best of Hands. And If Something Isn't Quite Right, Your Doctor Will Know in a Hurry - 2011

Current bands

Bands currently releasing music on the Big Scary Monsters record label.

 Alpha Male Tea Party
 Antarctigo Vespucci
 American Football
 Beach Slang
 Caspian
 Cassels
 Cursive
 Cultdreams
 Gnarwolves
 Gulfer
 Hell Is For Heroes
 Honey Lung
 InTechnicolour
 Lakes
 Jamie Lenman
 Kevin Devine
 Lemuria
 Martha
 Meat Wave
 Me Rex
 mewithoutYou
 Mom Jeans
 Nervus
 NOBRO
 Orchards
 Owen
 Pedro The Lion
 Pkew pkew pkew
 Proper.
 Prince Daddy & The Hyena
 Single Mothers
 Slaughter Beach, Dog
 Tangled Hair
 Terrible Love
 The Get Up Kids
 The Winter Passing
 Tiny Moving Parts
 Totorro
 Tree River
 Tricot
 Vinnie Caruana 
 We Were Promised Jetpacks
 Woahnows
 yndi halda

Previous bands

Bands who have previously recorded for the label include:

 Adebisi Shank
 Andrew W.K.
 Axes
 Blakfish
 Boom in the Diamond Industry
 Cats and Cats and Cats
 Chariots
 Colour
 Crash of Rhinos
 CSTVT
 Days Ago
 Delta Sleep
 Doe
 Econoline
 Face for Radio
Gender Roles
 Get Cape. Wear Cape. Fly
 Grown Ups
 Hiding With Girls
 Hold Your Horse Is
 Hop Along
 House of Brothers
 Itch
 Jairus
 Jeniferever
 Joyce Manor
 La Dispute
 Meet Me In St. Louis
 Mimas
 Minus The Bear
 Modern Baseball
 Mountain Men Anonymous
 My Awesome Compilation
 My Favourite Co-Pilot
 Pet Symmetry
 Pictures Paint Words
 Pulled Apart By Horses
 PWR BTTM
 Querelle
 Richard Walters
 Secondsmile
 Shoes and Socks Off
 Sleep Kit
 Sparks Lights and Flames
 Stories and Comets
 Tall Ships
 Talons
 Teflon Monkey
 The Campaign for Real Time
 The Caretaker
 The Dudley Corporation
 The Fall Of Troy
 The Next Autumn Soundtrack
 The Remarkable Rocket
 The Tupolev Ghost
 Thin Lips
 This Town Needs Guns
 Through Silence
 Toe
 Tubelord
 Walter Schreifels
 Written From Negative
 You Blew It!

References

External links

Record labels established in 2003
British independent record labels